Peter Myndert Dox (September 11, 1813 – April 2, 1891) was an American politician who served the state of Alabama in the U.S. House of Representatives between 1869 and 1873.

Early life
Dox was born in Geneva, Ontario County, New York on September 11, 1813. He was the eldest child of Abraham Dox and Anne Cary ( Nicholas) Dox. Among his siblings were John Nicolas Dox, Mary Blair Dox (wife of Timothy Fales Wardwell), Anne Nicholas Dox, and Ernest B. Dox.

His paternal grandfather was merchant and skipper Pieter Dox, who served in the French and Indian War and the Revolutionary War. His paternal uncles included Myndert M. Dox, Collector of the Port of Buffalo, and Gerrit L. Dox, New York State Treasurer. His maternal grandfather was U.S. Representative John Nicholas from Virginia's 18th district.

He graduated from Hobart College at Geneva in 1833.

Career
He studied law, was admitted to the bar, and practiced at Geneva. Dox served as a member of the New York State Assembly in 1842, and as a Know Nothing judge of the Ontario County courts from November 1855 until his resignation on March 18, 1856. He then moved to Alabama and settled in Madison County, where he engaged in agricultural pursuits.

Dox was a delegate to the Alabama constitutional convention of 1865. In 1868, he was elected as a Democrat to the U.S. House of Representatives, and reelected for the following term, serving until 1873.

Personal life
On October 12, 1854, Dox married Matilda Walker Pope (1826–1871). After the death of his first wife in 1871, he married Margaret Simpson.

He retired from public life, and died in Huntsville on April 2, 1891. He is buried in Maple Hill Cemetery in Huntsville.

References

External links 
 

1813 births
1891 deaths
Politicians from Geneva, New York
Members of the New York State Assembly
New York (state) lawyers
New York (state) state court judges
Hobart and William Smith Colleges alumni
People from Madison County, Alabama
Democratic Party members of the United States House of Representatives from Alabama
19th-century American politicians
19th-century American judges
19th-century American lawyers